Robin Southwell, OBE, is a British businessman. He is the UK head of the aerospace company EADS (now Airbus). He was born on 10 April 1960, the son of Peter and Susan Southwell, and lives in Cobham, Surrey. He was educated at Finchley Manor Hill  Comprehensive school in Barnet and studied economics and history at the University of Hull.

Career
He worked for  British Aerospace (now BAE Systems) from 1981 to 2000. From 2001 to 2002 he was CEO of W S Atkins. He joined EADS in January 2003, initially as CEO of Airtanker Ltd. In July 2005 he was appointed CEO of EADS UK.

Other appointments
Other appointments include:
 Chairman of Quest Aviation Services, Concord Ltd and Airbase Group Ltd
 President of ADS 
 Trustee of the RAF Museum
 Non-executive director of Farnborough International Ltd  
 Governor of Parkside School 
 UK Business Ambassador (appointed by Prime Minister David Cameron)

Personal life
In 1988 he married Sally Deakin and they have one son and one daughter.

Controversy
On 10 May 2014, The Independent newspaper published a report detailing the circumstances surrounding the demise of the company Corporate Jet Services. This company collapsed in 2007, owing its main creditor, HBOS, about £100m. Robin Southwell said via his lawyers that he "was appointed by HBOS to assist a company in difficulty and was only ever a non-executive director that acted on the bank's instructions".

References

Living people
Alumni of the University of Hull
1960 births